Kurnool revenue division (or Kurnool division) is an administrative division in the Kurnool district of the Indian state of Andhra Pradesh. It is one of the 3 revenue divisions in the district with 8 mandals under its administration. The divisional headquarters is located at Kurnool.

History 

Kurnool revenue division in old kurnool district

Administration 
There are 8 mandals administered under the revenue division. They are:

See also 
List of revenue divisions in Andhra Pradesh

References 

Revenue divisions in Andhra Pradesh
Kurnool district